Senate elections were held in Kazakhstan on 1 October 2014 during the 5th convocation of the Kazakh Senate. The elections were held following a decree by then-president Nursultan Nazarbayev.

Seats
All 16 seats representing the regions of Kazakhstan were elected by the local legislative bodies (maslihats). 3,236 out of the 3,279 eligible legislators voted in the election.

Electoral system 
Members of the Senate are elected on the basis of indirect suffrage by secret ballot. Half of elected members of the Senate are up for election every three years. Fifteen members are appointed by the President of Kazakhstan with the view to ensure representation for all the diverse national, cultural components of society. The term of office for the members of the Senate is 6 years.

Structure of Senate
Each of the fourteen region, and the cities of Almaty and Astana are represented by two senators, while 15 senators are appointed by the President of Kazakhstan.

References

Kazakhstan
Elections in Kazakhstan
2014 in Kazakhstan
October 2014 events in Asia